ASTER is a planned space mission under development by the Brazilian Space Agency that will launch a spacecraft to orbit a near-Earth object known as , a triple asteroid system. The launch is scheduled for 2025, with a rendezvous in 2024/2027.

According to de Brum et al. 2021, the launch is planned for June 2022 (asteroid arrival in December 2024) or June 2025 (arrival September 2027).

Overview

Brazil is promoting STEM at its universities and technological industries by engaging in the first Brazilian deep space mission and developing all the science instrument payloads, attitude control and navigation systems, as well as solar electric propulsion. The mission was originally intended in 2010 for a 2014 launch, then pushed back to 2015, to 2020, and is currently set for launch in 2022/2025. As of 2017, the estimated budget is of US$60 million.

The spacecraft features four solar electric thrusters developed by  Brazil. The engines are Hall effect thrusters powered by solar panels made out of gallium arsenide that are capable of generating up to 2.1 kW. From this, 110 W will be available to science instruments.

The ASTER mission team leaders are Antonio Gil Vicente de Brum, Marcelo Assafin, Flávio C. Cruz, and Álvaro Alberto Cuccolo.

Objectives

The primary objective of ASTER project is to promote science, technology, engineering, and mathematics (STEM) at its universities and technological industries by engaging in the first Brazilian deep space mission. Since 2010, Brazil has been developing the desired science instrument payloads, attitude control and navigation systems, as well as a novel solar electric propulsion engine with reduced energy requirements. 

The science objectives include measurements of the bulk properties of the triple asteroid system (size, shape, volume, density, dynamics, spin state, and rotation speed), the internal properties (structure, mass distribution, gravitational field) and surface properties (mineral composition, morphology, elemental composition).

ASTER may carry an astrobiology experiment to determine the viability of some selected microorganisms in deep space, and it may also measure the deep space plasma environment along the trajectory.

Science payload

The  science payload consists of: 
 Imaging Camera, a multispectral camera with wide and narrow-band
 Laser rangefinder, called ASTER Laser Rangefinder (ALR), will map the surface and texture of the target asteroids, and perform a geodesic and geophysical characterization with a ≤10 m precision. Its mass is <5 kg, and the power required is < 20 W 
 Infrared spectrometer, to determine surface composition
 Mass spectrometer, to determine the asteroid surface composition 
 Synthetic aperture radar (SAR), to produce two-dimensional images or three-dimensional reconstructions of the asteroids
 Along the trajectory, some microbiology experiments may be performed to measure microorganisms' survival in deep space.

Solar electric propulsion

The spacecraft features a type of solar electric propulsion based on the Hall effect thruster. The thruster was developed by the Plasma Physics Laboratory at the University of Brasilia (LFP-UnB). The engineers created a modification that employs an array of permanent magnets to produce a radial magnetic field inside the plasma channel of the thruster to accelerate the xenon propellant ions and generate thrust. Bench tests in vacuum indicate that the use of permanent magnets reduces the electrical power consumption by 30%, which allows for the use of smaller and lighter solar panels. The Brazilian engineers named it Permanent Magnet Hall Thruster, or PMHT.  

The spacecraft architecture plans to mount four PMHT plasma thrusters, where two will be spares. All four thrusters operating simultaneously produce 160 mN, although the ASTER mission can be performed with thrust in the interval between 80 mN to 120 mN of total thrust.

The spacecraft will be launched to low Earth orbit (approximately 400 km altitude), where it will then use its plasma thrusters to increase its speed and raise its elliptical orbit until it reaches escape velocity for an heliocentric transfer to the asteroid. Complex modeling was done to determine techniques to safely orbit the triple system at close range.

Target asteroid system

The  triple asteroid system is a carbonaceous (C-type asteroid) from the Amor asteroid group. Such asteroids hold clues of the initial stages of planetary formation and also the origin of water and abiogenesis on Earth. The main central body is an irregular object with a diameter about 2.8 km, while the other two are small objects 1.1 km and 0.4 km across.

See also

List of minor planets and comets visited by spacecraft

References

Missions to near-Earth asteroids
Missions to asteroids
Space program of Brazil